The Bryn Mawr Mainliners is a men's a cappella chorus, based in Bryn Mawr, Pennsylvania.  Chartered in 1963 as an official chapter of the Barbershop Harmony Society, the chorus is rich in both history and accomplishment.

History
In 1963, some singers in the Philadelphia suburbs expressed an interest in starting a chorus that would dedicate itself to both musical excellence and community service.  After choosing the suburb of Bryn Mawr as their initial location, the men incorporated as a chapter of the  Barbershop Harmony Society.  The Bryn Mawr Mainliners chapter competes in the Atlantic Division of the Mid-Atlantic District of the Barbershop Harmony Society.

The Mainliners competed regularly and first won the Mid-Atlantic District championship in 1990 under the direction of Eric Jackson, earning the privilege of representing the district at the International contest the following summer in Louisville, Kentucky.  In July 1991, in their first International contest appearance, the Mainliners earned a 6th-place finish.

After their first victory in 1991, the Mainliners again won the District Championship in 1991 and attended the International contest in 1992 in New Orleans under the direction of Bill Oppenheim placing 19th. The Mainliners again represented the Mid-Atlantic District on the International stage in 1997 in Indianapolis and placed 16th under the direction of Rick Serpico.

Awards and recognition
 Mid-Atlantic District (BHS) Champions in 1991 and 1997
 Qualified to Compete in the International Chorus Competition 4 times
 Atlantic Division Champions 14 times

Discography
 Mainliners On Track!  (1999)
 Harmony for the Holidays  (1998)

See also
 Barbershop Harmony Society
 Mid-Atlantic District (BHS)
 Barbershop music
 Barbershop Arrangements
 Singing Valentines
 A cappella music

References

External links
 Official Web Site: http://www.mainliners.org/
 Chapter Entry for Mid-Atlantic District of the Barbershop Harmony Society.
 Contest Results and Scores for the Mid-Atlantic District.
 Mid-Atlantic District of the Barbershop Harmony Society.

A cappella musical groups
Choirs in Pennsylvania
American vocal groups
Barbershop Harmony Society choruses
Musical groups established in 1963
1963 establishments in Pennsylvania